São Domingos (Portuguese for Saint Dominic) may refer to:

Places

Brazil
São Domingos, Bahia
São Domingos, Goiás
São Domingos, Santa Catarina
São Domingos, Sergipe
São Domingos do Araguaia, Pará
São Domingos do Azeitão, Maranhão
São Domingos do Capim, Pará
São Domingos do Cariri, Paraíba
São Domingos das Dores, Minas Gerais
São Domingos do Maranhão, Maranhãop
São Domingos do Norte, Espírito Santo
São Domingos de Pombal, Paraíba
São Domingos do Prata, Minas Gerais
São Domingos do Sul, Rio Grande do Sul
São Domingos (district of São Paulo)
 A neighbourhood of Niterói

Cape Verde
São Domingos, Cape Verde, a town in the island of Santiago
São Domingos, Cape Verde (municipality), a municipality in the island of Santiago

Portugal
São Domingos (Santiago do Cacém), a parish in the municipality of Santiago do Cacém
São Domingos de Ana Loura, a parish in the municipality of Estremoz
São Domingos de Benfica, a parish in the municipality of Lisbon
São Domingos de Rana, a parish in the municipality of Cascais

Guinea-Bissau
São Domingos (Guinea-Bissau), a municipality in north-western Guinea-Bissau

Other
São Domingos Futebol Clube, a Brazilian football (soccer) club
Associação Sportiva São Domingos, a Brazilian football (soccer) club

See also
 Domingos (name)
São Domingos River (disambiguation)
 San Domingo (disambiguation)
 Santo Domingo (disambiguation)